The After Hours til Dawn Tour, previously titled The After Hours Tour, is the ongoing seventh concert tour by Canadian artist the Weeknd, in support of his fourth and fifth studio albums, After Hours (2020) and Dawn FM (2022). The tour, which primarily visits stadiums, commenced its first leg on July 14, 2022, at Lincoln Financial Field in Philadelphia and is set to conclude on October 25, 2023 at Estadio Akron in Guadalajara. 

The tour was originally only in support of After Hours, set to take place in arenas, and set to begin on June 11, 2020, in Vancouver and to conclude on November 16 in London. However, due to concerns from the ongoing COVID-19 pandemic, all of the original dates were postponed twice (first to 2021 and then to early 2022) before being cancelled in favor of an all-stadium tour due to arena constraints.

American rapper and singer Doja Cat was originally set to perform as the opening act for the North America leg of the tour, but pulled out due to tonsil surgery. She was replaced by Canadian DJ Kaytranada, Swedish singer Snoh Aalegra and American record producer Mike Dean.

Background
On February 20, 2020, the Weeknd announced through social media that he would be touring North America and Europe later that year in support of his fourth studio album After Hours. He also revealed that Don Toliver would open for the North American leg, Black Atlass would open for the European leg, and Sabrina Claudio would open for both. Additional dates were added in Vancouver, Miami, Los Angeles and Toronto on March 3 due to high demand, while an additional date was added in London on the following day, and on March 12 for the Czech Republic.

Due to concerns regarding the COVID-19 pandemic, the tour's promoter, Live Nation Entertainment, announced that all arena tours scheduled to take place in 2020 would be postponed. When asked about the status of his tour during a cover story with Variety in April, the Weeknd stated that the tour would not be cancelled and that he and his team were working on new itinerary. He announced new dates for the tour on May 20, with it being scheduled to commence on June 12, 2021, in Vancouver, and to conclude on November 11 in Berlin.

On February 3, 2021, the Weeknd postponed the tour for a second time and revealed that it was now scheduled to begin in January 2022 in Vancouver. He postponed the tour a third time on October 18, and announced that the tour would now begin in the summer of 2022 and would now be held in stadiums due to arena constraints. He also revealed the tour's new name as a result of his decision to incorporate elements of Dawn FM, his fifth studio album and follow up to After Hours. After a small delay due to the Russo-Ukrainian War, the Weeknd announced the North American leg of the tour on March 3 with Doja Cat as the opening act. Pre-sales for those who purchased a ticket for the Weeknd's previously postponed tours began on March 4. Tickets went on sale for the general public on March 10. An additional date was added to Inglewood on March 11. As a UN Goodwill Ambassador for the World Food Programme (WFP), the Weeknd launched the XO Humanitarian Fund in partnership with the organization. He will donate US$1 from every ticket sold, in addition to a US$500,000 donation, to the WFP.

On May 20, 2022, Doja Cat announced she would no longer be opening for the North American leg due to tonsil surgery. Kaytranada, Snoh Aalegra and Mike Dean were announced as the new openers on June 30. The first stop on the tour in the Weeknd's hometown of Toronto at Rogers Centre on July 8, 2022, was forced to be postponed at the last moment due to the 2022 Rogers network outage affecting the venue's operations. It was later rescheduled to September 22. A second night in Toronto for September 23 was announced on August 29.

During his second show in Inglewood at SoFi Stadium on September 3, 2022, the Weeknd ended the show in the middle of "Can't Feel My Face". "I don’t know what just happened, but I just lost my voice," he said to the stadium of fans. "This is killing me, I don’t want to stop the show but I can’t give you the concert I want to give you right now. I’m gonna make sure everybody’s good; you’ll get your money back, I’ll do a show real soon for you guys. But I wanted to come out and personally apologize." Fans were stunned following his announcement, reluctant to leave their seats, in confusion. He later announced the following message on his social media, "My voice went out during the first song and I’m devastated. Felt it go and my heart dropped. My deepest apologies to my fans here. I promise I’ll make it up to you with a new date." On September 6, 2022, the Weeknd announced that "[his] voice is safe and with rest, [he will] be solid and able to bring the show [for which his] TORONTO fans are waiting." He also said that the "LA date is being worked out soon." As of September 7, 2022, the Ticketmaster website now includes the following message regarding the concert: "The Event Organizer has had to postpone your event. Please hold onto your tickets as they will be valid for the new date." Fans were also sent the same message via email, including the option for refunds if preferred over using the tickets on the rescheduled date. On September 27, the rescheduled show was announced for November 26, with an additional show added for November 27.

On February 2, 2023, the Weeknd announced an HBO concert film showcasing the November 27 show at SoFi Stadium titled The Weeknd: Live at SoFi Stadium, which aired on HBO and streamed on HBO Max on February 25. On March 3, 2023, the Weeknd released Live at SoFi Stadium, his first live album.

Stage and aesthetic 
In a press release to Variety, the After Hours til Dawn Tour "will see [the Weeknd's] most ambitious production to date reflecting the creative journey that continues to unfold for both [After Hours and Dawn FM], creating worlds within worlds as we have all been watching unfold in various television performances, music videos and short films bringing these first two pieces of his trilogy to life." The Weeknd's creative director and childhood friend La Mar Taylor explained in an interview with Variety that the tour would be theatrical and conceptual, saying: "There is a linear story between After Hours and Dawn FM, and I think the audience will walk away with different interpretations of the show. To us, that’s the whole point.” Binance, the tour's sponsor, provided more details of the tour via their non-fungible token (NFT) inspired by the show, saying that the Weeknd "journeys through a cosmic cataclysm that has erupted and plagued the Earth. The devastation is widespread and will most likely continue till dawn." The stage design has 3 stages: the main stage, showcasing a row of destroyed buildings including Toronto's CN Tower, and a screen behind them showing visuals of a futuristic post apocalyptic skyline; the main stage leads to a catwalk leading into a quadrangular stage, which features an inflatable moon over its edge and also unites the catwalk leading into a circular stage. The show displays The Weeknd performing in all three of these stages, while his Imperial Guards walk and dance in a cult-like manner, as shown in the "Sacrifice" music video for Dawn FM. At the start of the show, during "Alone Again" and "Gasoline", he wears a mask reminiscent of the "How Do I Make You Love Me?" animated music video. During the final two songs, LED wristbands provided by PixMob which are given to each attendee, light up.

Setlist
This set list is representative of the first show in Philadelphia, performed on July 14, 2022. It does not represent all concerts for the duration of the tour.

 "Alone Again"
 "Gasoline"
 "Sacrifice" (Swedish House Mafia Remix)
 "How Do I Make You Love Me?"
 "Can't Feel My Face"
 "Take My Breath"
 "Hurricane"
 "The Hills"
 "Often"
 "Crew Love"
 "Starboy"
 "Heartless"
 "Low Life"
 "Or Nah"
 "Kiss Land"
 "Party Monster"
 "Faith"
 "After Hours"
 "Out of Time"
 "I Feel It Coming"
 "Die for You"
 "Is There Someone Else?"
 "I Was Never There"
 "Wicked Games"
 "Call Out My Name"
 "The Morning"
 "Save Your Tears"
 "Less than Zero"
 "Blinding Lights"

Shows

Notes

References

The Weeknd concert tours
Concert tours postponed due to the COVID-19 pandemic
2022 concert tours
2023 concert tours
Concert tours of North America
Concert tours of Europe
Concert tours of Africa
Concert tours of South America
Concert tours of Asia
Concert tours of Australia